Vanessa Arauz León (born 5 February 1989) is an Ecuadorian football manager was the head coach of the Chilean club Colo-Colo women's team until 2020. She was the head coach of Ecuador at the 2015 FIFA Women's World Cup at 26 years old, hired at age 24, setting a world record for youngest coach at a Men's or Women's FIFA World Cup.
In the 2015 FIFA World Cup, Ecuador finished last, only scoring one goal. Although most federations might have fired the coach after a score that low, especially a female coach. Surprisingly the federation retained Arauz for the women's national program at all levels. By 2017, she was coaching all women's teams for the federation and was named an official instructor by CONMEBOL. In that position, Arauz travelled to provide assistance and training to women's programs throughout South America. Through the efforts of the federation, Arauz proved to be the face of change within Latin America and women's rights, specifically within football.

References

External links

1989 births
Living people
Ecuadorian football managers
Female association football managers
Women's association football managers
2015 FIFA Women's World Cup managers
Female sports coaches
Ecuadorian expatriate sportspeople in Chile
Ecuador women's national football team managers
Expatriate football managers in Chile